Wayne is an old English surname meaning a craftsman: wagon driver or builder. It is the surname of:
 Anthony Wayne, general in the American colonial and United States  armies 
 Arthur Trezevant Wayne (1863–1930), American ornithologist
 David Wayne, American actor
 David Wayne (musician), American musician
 Don Wayne, American magic designer
 Don Wayne (songwriter), American country music songwriter
 Edward Johnson Wayne (1902–1990), British physician and professor of medicine
 Elsie Wayne, Canadian politician
 Fredd Wayne, American actor
 Gary Wayne, American baseball player
 Isaac Wayne (1772-1852), U.S. Congressman
 Isaac Wayne (1699-1774), Pennsylvania Provincial Assembly member, Captain in Pennsylvania Provincial Forces during the French and Indian War
 James Moore Wayne, US congressman
 Jeff Wayne, American musician
 John Wayne, American actor
 Kenny "Blues Boss" Wayne (born 1944), American blues, boogie-woogie and jazz pianist, singer and songwriter
 Kyra Petrovskaya Wayne, Russian-American writer
 Leland Wayne, birth name of Metro Boomin, American record producer
 Naunton Wayne, British actor
 Olivia Wayne (born 1986), British sports journalist and television presenter
 Patrick Wayne, American actor
 Reggie Wayne, American football player
 Ronald Wayne, American businessman
 Catie Wayne, Internet celebrity

Fictional characters
 Bruce Wayne, the secret identity of Batman
 Thomas Wayne, the deceased father of Batman
 Martha Wayne, the deceased mother of Batman
 Damian Wayne, the son of Batman